Brandon Scott Harper (born April 29, 1976) is an American former professional baseball catcher, who played in Major League Baseball (MLB) for the Washington Nationals.

Personal life
Harper was born in Odessa, Texas on April 29, 1976. He went to high school in Hobbs, New Mexico. He attended Dallas Baptist University. He was the Florida Marlins' 4th round selection and 126th overall selection of the 1997 Major League Baseball Draft.

He is not related to Nationals right fielder Bryce Harper, although he does have a younger brother named Bryce.

Harper now lives in Colorado with his wife and 3 kids Hope Beck and Ellis and works for Edward Jones.

Career
Harper spent 11 years in the minor leagues, battling a number of injuries that kept him out of big-league action.

He played for both the Florida Marlins and Detroit Tigers minor league system. He made his debut with the Washington Nationals on August 9, 2006.

Both of Harper's home runs came on the same day, in an August 20 game against the Philadelphia Phillies.

References

External links

Washington Nationals players
Baseball players from Texas
1976 births
Living people
Major League Baseball catchers
Dallas Baptist Patriots baseball players
Hobbs High School alumni
Brevard County Manatees players
Carolina Mudcats players
Columbus Clippers players
Erie SeaWolves players
Gulf Coast Marlins players
Kane County Cougars players
New Orleans Zephyrs players
Portland Sea Dogs players
Toledo Mud Hens players
Utica Blue Sox players